Aran Islands GAA (Irish: Cumann Lúthchleas Oileáin Árann) is a Gaelic Athletic Association club based on the three Aran Islands in the Gaeltacht, County Galway, Ireland. It caters for the sporting and social needs of the people of the Islands through Gaelic football.
There are many age groups within the club including minor, under 16 and junior.

Achievements
 Connacht Junior Club Football Championship: Winners 2014

References

Gaelic games clubs in County Galway
1992 establishments in Ireland